Neobidessodes grossus is a carnivorous subterranean water beetle, in the Bidessini tribe of the Dytiscidae family. It was first described in 1922 by Albrecht Zimmermann as Bidessus grossus. It was assigned to the genus Bidessodes by Watts in  1978, and to the new genus of Neobidessodes in 2009 by Hendrich and others. 

It is found in Queensland.

References

Dytiscidae
Beetles of Australia
Beetles described in 1922
Taxa named by Albrecht Zimmermann